Charles Fredrick Zewe II is a former anchor for CNN Headline News in the 1990s, and also a correspondent for the CNN Southwest Bureau in Dallas.

Biography
Zewe received his bachelor's degree from Louisiana State University, his master's degree from Loyola University New Orleans, and his Ph.D. from LSU. Zewe had his start in the New Orleans market, first reporting for The States-Item newspaper and then anchoring and executive-producing for stations WWL-TV (1971-1976) and WDSU-TV (1976-78/1981-87), as well as Public Affairs Director and anchor of the daily public affairs program "Journal" at WYES-TV (1978–80). He also was LSU System Vice President for Communications and External Affairs from 2005 to 2013, serving as the chief spokesman for the seven-campus Louisiana State University System.

He is married to Gayle (née Traina) Zewe; they have two sons, Charles F. Zewe III and Scott C. Zewe.

Notes and references

External links
 Photos of Charles Zewe anchoring at Headline News

Living people
Year of birth missing (living people)
American reporters and correspondents
Television anchors from New Orleans
Louisiana State University alumni
Loyola University New Orleans alumni
CNN people
Place of birth missing (living people)